Tigoa (sometimes spelt Tingoa) is a village on Rennell Island, Solomon Islands. It is the administrative centre of Rennell and Bellona Province. It is located approximately 12-20 metres above sea level.

Airstrip
 Rennell/Tingoa Airport

Population
There were 569 persons at the 2009 Census; the latest estimate was 613 persons in 2013.

Education
  Tupuaki Province Secondary School
  Tupuaki Primary School

References

Populated places in Rennell and Bellona Province